The 1948 SANFL Grand Final was an Australian rules football competition.   beat  106 to 49.

References 

SANFL Grand Finals
SANFL Grand Final, 1948